Mitogen-activated protein kinase kinase kinase kinase 3 is a protein that in humans is encoded by the MAP4K3 gene.

Function

This gene encodes a member of the mitogen-activated protein kinase kinase kinase kinase family. The encoded protein activates key effectors in cell signalling, among them c-Jun. Alternatively spliced transcripts encoding multiple isoforms have been observed for this gene.

References

Further reading